Trinity Episcopal Church was a historic church located at 48 Main Street in Pawtucket, Rhode Island.  Built by the Episcopalians, the building was sold to the Catholics in 1977 and became the St. George Maronite Catholic Church within the Diocese of Providence. The church burned down in 2005, and was not rebuilt.

Architecture
The Gothic Revival structure was constructed of random fieldstone ashlars, capped with sandstone; the roof was slate over an open timber arched frame. A separate chancel was placed on the south end of the building, and a shed-roofed ambulatory was run along the west side to house a side chapel and its altar. An odd detail was a set of dormers in the main west side roof, each with a lancet window; other windows also generally were of the lancet form, including a triple set at either end of the building. A belltower was attached to the northwest corner of the building; its third story, which contained the bell chamber, was topped with a Rhenish helm roof and was made octagonal through the truncation of the four corners.

History
The Trinity Episcopal Church was established in 1845. The architect of the church was Samuel J. Ladd, a founding member of the congregation. He drafted the plan between 1850 and 1851. In 1865, architect Clifton A. Hall was hired to design an addition, which consisted of the low ambulatory on the west side of the building. At the same time, the Providence firm of Cattanach & Cliff was hired to redecorate the interior.  In 1901, a parish house was built. It was designed by noted practitioners Stone, Carpenter & Willson.  This small building extended from the rear of the church to School Street.  Frances E. Henley executed some alterations in 1937.

Trinity also owned a house it used as a rectory. It was located at 50 Main Street, at the corner of School. It had been built in 1815 as the residence of Eliphalet Slack. It was a 3-story house in the Federal style.

The house was destroyed many years before the church itself. The church complex was added to the National Register of Historic Places in 1972. It was destroyed by fire in 2005 and not rebuilt.

Gallery

See also
National Register of Historic Places listings in Pawtucket, Rhode Island

References

External links 
Pawtucket, Rhode Island website

Lebanese-American history
Maronite churches in the United States
Former Roman Catholic church buildings in Rhode Island
Roman Catholic churches completed in 1853
Churches on the National Register of Historic Places in Rhode Island
19th-century Roman Catholic church buildings in the United States
19th-century Maronite Church church buildings
Buildings and structures in Pawtucket, Rhode Island
Demolished buildings and structures in Rhode Island
National Register of Historic Places in Pawtucket, Rhode Island
Historic district contributing properties in Rhode Island
Buildings and structures demolished in 2005